Kim Jung-Bin (born 23 August 1987) is a South Korean former footballer who played as midfielder for Gyeongnam FC in his last season.

Career
He was selected by Pohang Steelers in the 2011 K League draft.

He finished his military duty in September 2013 and returned to the Steelers.

He was released by Pohang and joined Suwon FC before 2014 season starts and made 19 appearances and 2 goals. He signed with Suwon FC on a permanent basis in 2014.

References

External links 

1987 births
Living people
Association football midfielders
South Korean footballers
Pohang Steelers players
Gimcheon Sangmu FC players
Suwon FC players
Gyeongnam FC players
K League 1 players
K League 2 players